From 4 December 1976 to 21 September 1979, the Central African Republic was officially known as the Central African Empire, after military dictator (and president at the time) Marshal Jean-Bédel Bokassa declared himself Emperor of Central Africa, and the republic an empire. 

The monarchy was abolished (the most recent one ruled by an emperor) and the republic was restored on 21 September 1979, when Bokassa was overthrown and replaced with David Dacko, with French support.

History

Proclamation

In September 1976, Bokassa dissolved the government and replaced it with the Central African Revolutionary Council. On 4 December 1976, at the ruling MESAN party congress, Bokassa instituted a new constitution, converted back to Roman Catholicism – he had briefly become a Muslim earlier in the year – and declared the republic to be a monarchy: the "Central African Empire". He had himself crowned and styled himself "His Imperial Majesty" on 4 December 1977.

Bokassa's full title was "Emperor of Central Africa by the Will of the Central African People, United within the National Political Party, the MESAN". His regalia, lavish coronation ceremony, and régime were largely inspired by Napoléon I, who had converted the French First Republic, of which he was First Consul, into the First French Empire. The coronation ceremony was estimated to cost his country roughly  – one-third of the country's budget and all of France's aid for that year.

Bokassa justified his actions by claiming that creating a monarchy would help Central Africa "stand out" from the rest of the continent, and earn the world's respect. Despite invitations, no foreign leaders attended the event. Many thought Bokassa was insane and compared his egotistical extravagance with that of Africa's other well-known eccentric anti-colonial leader, Field Marshal Idi Amin of Uganda.

Overthrow

By January 1979, French support for Bokassa had eroded after riots in Bangui led to a massacre of civilians. Between 17 and 19 April, a number of high school students were arrested after they had protested against wearing the expensive, government-required school uniforms; an estimated 100 were killed.

Emperor Bokassa personally participated in the massacre, where he was reported beating dozens of children to death with his own cane. The massive press coverage which followed the deaths of the students opened the way for a successful coup which saw French troops in Operation Barracuda restore former president David Dacko to power while Bokassa was away in Libya meeting with Gaddafi on 20 September 1979.

Bokassa's overthrow by the French government was called "France's last colonial expedition" by veteran French diplomat and regime change architect Jacques Foccart. François Mitterrand refused to have France intervene in this manner again. Operation Barracuda began the night of 20 September and ended early the next morning. An undercover commando squad from the French intelligence agency SDECE, joined by the 1st Marine Infantry Parachute Regiment led by Colonel Brancion-Rouge, landed by Transall C-160, and managed to secure Bangui M'Poko International Airport. Upon arrival of two more transport aircraft, a message was sent to Colonel Degenne to come in with eight Puma helicopters and Transall aircraft, which took off from N'Djaména military airport in neighbouring Chad.

By 12:30 p.m. on September 21, 1979, the pro-French Dacko proclaimed the fall of the Central African Empire. David Dacko remained president until he was overthrown on September 1, 1981, by General André Kolingba.

Bokassa died on November 3, 1996, in the Central African Republic. In 2009, Jean-Serge Bokassa, who was seven years old when the Emperor was overthrown, stated his father's reign was "indefensible".

International response

France's role
When Jean-Bédel Bokassa took control of the Central African Republic, the French president at the time, Charles de Gaulle, did not want to engage with the new leader, refusing to receive him and calling him a "bloody idiot." After heavy advising from his chief of staff, Jacques Foccart, De Gaulle finally met Bokassa in 1969, three years after he came into power. After Charles De Gaulle died and Georges Pompidou exited office, Valery Giscard d'Estaing took office in 1974. Giscard d'Estaing and Bokassa engaged in correspondence and with Giscard d'Estaing's administration, France and the Central African Empire became close allies. When Bokassa declared that he was going to be hosting a coronation for himself as the emperor of the new Central African Empire, many of the novelties that attributed to the luxurious event came from France. This included an imperial crown as well as a golden throne in the shape of an eagle. After various allegations against Bokassa including the beating of school children as well as cannibalism France intervened with two operations that sought to remove Bokassa from office, the final one being Operation Barracuda.

President Valéry Giscard

Valéry Giscard d'Estaing became the president of France in May 1974, where his relationship with Bokassa was more interactive than previous administrations. During his first visit to the country in 1970 Bokassa presented him with diamonds and ivory carvings. Giscard advised Bokassa to avoid a ceremony to the scale of Napoleon due to the Central African Empire's financial situation and though Bokassa ignored Giscard d'Estaing's warning, Giscard d'Estaing was the first to congratulate Bokassa on the transition to Empire. Their relationship made news on 10 October 1979 when a newspaper named the Le Canard enchaîné broke a story about Bokassa giving thirty carats of diamonds to Giscard d'Estaing and accused him of giving Giscard d'Estaing a plethora of gifts on his visits to the empire. These included elephant tusks, ivory carved objects as well as precious stones estimated to be worth one million francs. This scandal was later called "Diamondgate" or the Diamonds Affair scandal which later led to Giscard d'Estaing losing the presidency in the 1981 elections.

Operation Barracuda

Operation Barracuda was initiated in 1979 after the death of several school children after a protest that was shut down with many students imprisoned in Ngaraba. France severed ties with Bokassa, and began to plan his excommunication when the emperor began working with Muammar Gaddafi, the Libyan leader. Operation Barracuda entailed French soldiers entering the Central African Republic while Bokassa was on a trip to Libya and instating David Dacko, who had been exiled to Paris, as the new leader. France cut off all humanitarian aid for media presence and then later sent French troops into Bangui, the nation's capital, to install David Dacko as the new leader. Dacko stayed in a hotel in France, where he was exiled, awaiting the call to be transported into the nation as soon as Bokassa made himself unavailable. Leaders from Chad, the DRC (then Zaire) all agreed to the idea as well as to aid the French in transport and military support for Operation Barracuda. This operation's success effectively ended the Central African Empire and reintroduced the Central African Republic.

See also
 Saint-Sylvestre coup d'état
 History of the Central African Republic

Footnotes

Sources

Carayannis, Tatiana, and Lombard, Louisa. Making Sense of the Central African Republic. London: Zed Books, 2015.
Baxter, Peter. France in Centrafrique : From Bokassa and Operation Barracuda to the Days of EUFOR. Africa@War; v. 2. Solihull, West Midlands : Pinetown, South Africa: Helion ; 30° South Publishers, 2011.
Titley, E. Brian. Dark Age the Political Odyssey of Emperor Bokassa. Canadian Electronic Library. Canadian Publishers Collection. Montreal: McGill-Queen's University Press, 1997.

External links
 

1970s in the Central African Republic
Former empires in Africa
Former monarchies of Africa
Former monarchies
Military dictatorships
One-party states
Self-proclaimed monarchy
States and territories disestablished in 1979
States and territories established in 1976
1976 establishments in Africa
1979 disestablishments in the Central African Republic